Jo-ann Goldsmith is a trumpet player in the Canadian indie-rock band Broken Social Scene.  Although a social worker by training, she played shows with the band in their early years.  She is the ex-wife of de facto bandleader Kevin Drew.

References

Living people
Year of birth missing (living people)
Canadian trumpeters
Canadian indie rock musicians
21st-century trumpeters